The fourth season of The Voice Kids of Vietnam- Giọng hát Việt nhí began on 23 July 2017 on VTV3. New coaches for this season were The Remix winners Noo Phước Thịnh, Đông Nhi with her boyfriend Ông Cao Thắng and The Voice season 2 runner-up Vũ Cát Tường. Trịnh Nhật Minh won the competition on 29 October, marking the couple Nhi Thắng's first victory on the show.

Coaches and hosts

The coaching panel was entirely modified as producers wanted to "refresh the show with young generation's energy". After the season 3 finale, it was announced that the duo Giang Hồ would leave the show because of Lưu Hương Giang's pregnancy. Hồ Hoài Anh then moved to become the show's music executive. Cẩm Ly also expressed her desire to withdraw from the show to focus on other projects. Dương Khắc Linh did not return for the fourth season in 2016 because of his work on The X Factor Vietnam. In March 2016, Đông Nhi and Ông Cao Thắng were confirmed to be replacing the duo Giang Hồ as coaches for the fourth season. Noo Phước Thịnh was announced to be the third judge on 11 April. Although rumors stated that the fourth coach would be Sơn Tùng M-TP, on 6 June, The Voice season 2 runner-up Vũ Cát Tường was confirmed to be joining the show as the fourth and final judge. Meanwhile, singer and TV show host Ngô Kiến Huy became the show's new host, and was joined by actress Chi Pu in the liveshows.

Teams
Color key

Blind auditions 
The blind auditions consist of five episodes, airing from 23 July to 20 August 2016. Each coach has the length of the contestant's performance to choose them for their team. If more than two coaches want the same contestant, the contestant will choose which team they want to join. The blind auditions end when all teams are full.

Episode 1 (23 July)

Episode 2 (30 July)

Episode 3 (6 August)

Episode 4 (13 August)

Episode 5 (20 August)

The Battles
The 15 contestants in each team are divided into five match-ups, each with three contestants. Each group will perform a pre-rehearsed song on the stage. After going on stage to finish the confrontation song with the coaches, the coaches name one of the three contestants of each group as the winner. After all five matches conclude with five winners and ten losing contestants, each team coach nominates one of the ten losers of their team to go on to the Liveshow round together with five contestants who won their battles. After this round ends, each team has six contestants.

Each coach brought advisors to help them prepare for the battles. Noo Phước Thịnh worked with musician Nguyễn Hải Phong, who was the advisor for team Hiền Thục in The Voice Kids season 1. Team Nhi Thắng's advisor was songwriter/producer Huỳnh Hiền Năng. Vũ Cát Tường's advisor was Hồng Nhung, who was her coach in The Voice of Vietnam.

Colour key

Live shows
This season of The Voice Kids had format changes. Contestants who were eliminated before the finals have a chance to return to the finale via the new twist "Wildcard". The audience votes for contestants through the voting portal on the website . Wildcard voting closed on early Friday night (22 October 2016). Milana Zavolokina was the Wildcard contestant with 13.32% of the public vote and thus was brought back to the finals.

Color key:

Week 1 and 2 (September 17 & 24, 2016)
The first nine contestants of the three teams performed together at Liveshow 1. During the night, each team had three contestants. Results were not announced. The following nine contestants of all three teams performed together on Liveshow 2. On that night, each team had three contestants. The results of the contestants were announced at the end of Liveshow 2 in the following manner:
 The top two contestants receiving the highest public vote were automatically sent through the next round
 Two contestants selected by their coach were qualified for the next round
 The remaining two contestants were eliminated

Week 3 (October 1) 
At this live show, 12 contestants performed a solo performance. At the end of the night, two contestants who were selected by the audience and one selected by their coach moved on to the next round. The remaining one contestant was eliminated.

Week 4 (October 8)

Week 5 (October 15, 2017): Semifinals 
At Liveshow 5, each contestant performed a solo song and a duet song with their teammate. The person with the higher score based on 50% of the audience vote and 50% of the coach vote officially entered the finals. The other one was automatically eliminated.

Week 6 and 7 (October 22 & 29): The Finals 
On Liveshow 6, the 3 best contestant of three teams performed a solo song and a duet song with a guest performer. The audience votes were then announced from high to low. However, Liveshow 6 was a non-elimination night and all three contestants came to the finale together with one contestant who was eliminated but won the Wildcard after receiving the most votes from the websites Saostar and YouTube. The results of Liveshow 6 were added together with the results of the finale to find the winner of the show.

In the final round, four contestants (the Top 3 and one contestant who was eliminated but was brought back by the audience) performed two songs: one solo and one duet with their coach. The contestant with the highest number of votes was crowned the champion of The Voice Kids 2016.

Elimination chart

Artist's info

Result details

References

1
2016 Vietnamese television seasons
2010s Vietnamese television series